Claude Pierre Edmond Giraud (5 February 1936 in Chamalières – 3 November 2020) was a French actor.

Career
Claude Giraud studied with Tania Balachova at the Théâtre du Vieux-Colombier; Berthe Bovy and Jean Meyer at the École de la rue Blanche (École nationale supérieure des arts et techniques du théâtre, ENSATT). In November 1957 he was accepted as a student at CNSAD Conservatoire national supérieur d'art dramatique, where he studied with Jean Debucourt and Fernand Ledoux. Upon his graduation he was the first male student to win all three categories during the Concourse (Classical Comedy, Modern Comedy, Tragedy). In 1962 he was the first recipient of the newly created Prix Gérard Philipe. He was engaged at the Comédie Française in 1962 as a pensionnaire. Besides his debut role as Valère in Molière's The Miser, he played Arsace in Corneille's Bérénice, and the narrator in the stage adaptation of André Gide's short story Le retour de l'enfant prodigue (The Return of the Prodigal Son). Disappointed that he was only cast in small roles, he left the Comédie Française after a few months to start his film career. He played the leading role as Capitaine Langlois in François Leterrier's movie adaptation of Jean Giono's novel A King Without Distraction in 1962. He was Oedipus in the film adaptation of Jean Cocteau's The Infernal Machine. 
He joined the Compagnie Marie Bell to play a US tour in New York City, Boston, Washington D.C., and Princeton in October–November 1963. For his presentation of Hippolite in Phèdre and Titus in Bérénice at The Brooks Atkinson Theatre on Broadway, he was awarded the Theater World Award. 
He played the role of the soldier Georges in Roger Vadim's Circle of Love, a film adaptation of Arthur Schnitzler's scandalous play La Ronde (play). 
Between 1964 and 1966, Claude Giraud played the part of Philippe de Plessis-Bellières beside Michèle Mercier in three Angélique films: Angélique, Marquise des Anges, Marvelous Angelique, and Angelique and the King.
He returned to the Comédie Française in 1972 and became the 460th sociétaire in 1976. He left again in 1982 to join Jean-Laurent Cochet's newly created Théâtre Hébertot.

He gained fame in TV series as hero Morgan/Jacques de Saint-Hermine in the adventure series Les Compagnons de Jéhu by Michel Drach adapted from the eponymous novel by Alexandre Dumas. Bernard Toublanc-Michel engaged him in 1967 for the role of d'Aulnay in Adolphe ou l'âge tendre. The TV series Les rois maudits, where he played the role of Sir Roger Mortimer, was another huge success. In 1973, he played the fictional Arab revolutionary leader Mohamed Larbi Slimane, who poses as Rabbi Zeiligman in The Mad Adventures of Rabbi Jacob with Louis de Funès. In the TV movie Mamie Rose (1976) he played Claude Jade's husband Régis, whose marriage is saved by an au-pair granny played by Gisèle Casadesus.

Other TV series include Mathias Sandorf (1979), in which he played corrupt banker Silas Toronthal, based on Jules Verne's eponymous novel.

He married Catherine Marquand (1943-2012), 
a fellow acting student at the Conservatoire, in 1963. They had a son, Louis (*1963), and a daughter, Marianne (*1966), who is also an actress and married to French actor and director Jean Martinez.

Since 1987, he lived in Vernadel near Saint-Priest-des-Champs in Auvergne, where he owned a Connemara stud farm, Haras du Boissis.

Giraud died in Saint-Priest-des-Champs on 3 November 2020 and was buried there on 7 November 2020.

Theater

Filmography

TV films and series 

 1963: La Machine infernale by Jean Cocteau, directed by Claude Loursais: Œdipe
 1964: Le Commandant Watrin, adapted from the eponymous novel by Armand Lanoux, directed by Jacques Rutman: François Soubeyrac
 1965: Cinna (play) by Pierre Corneille, directed by Jean Kerchbron: Cinna
 1966: Les Compagnons de Jéhu, adapted from the eponymous novel by Alexandre Dumas, directed by Michel Drach : Morgan (Jacques de Saint-Hermine)
 1967: Sébastien parmi les hommes (Belle, Sebastian and the Horses (TV Mini-series) by Cécile Aubry: Pierre Maréchal
 1971: Tartuffe by Molière, directed by Marcel Cravenne: Cléante
 1972: Les Rois maudits by Claude Barma : Lord Roger Mortimer (2 episodes, 1973: Le lis et le lion; La louve de France)
 1974: Madame Bovary by Pierre Cardinal : Rodolphe Boulanger
 1975: Mamie Rose (TV film) by Pierre Goutas : Régis
 1976: Milady after the eponymous novel by Paul Morand, directed by François Leterrier: Grumbach
 1977: Le Loup blanc after the eponymous novel by Paul Féval, directed by Jean-Pierre Decourt: Hervé de Vaunoy
 1977: Richelieu, le cardinal de velours by Jean-Pierre Decourt: La Valette (4 episodes)
 1979: Mathias Sandorf by Jean-Pierre Decourt: Silas Toronthal
 1979: La Trilogie de la villégiature by Carlo Goldoni, directed by Giorgio Strehler: Leonardo
 1981: Les Fiancées de l'Empire by Jacques Doniol-Valcroze: Maxime d'Aurillac
 1982: Venise en hiver by Jacques Doniol-Valcroze: André Merrest
 1983: L'Homme de la nuit by Juan Luis Buñuel: Franck
 1986: À nous les beaux dimanches by Robert Mazoyer: Charles-Edgar Moreau
 1988: Les Cinq Dernières Minutes, by Gilles Combet, 1 episode (Un modèle de genre): Paul
 1992: La Cavalière (TV film in 2 parts) by Philippe Monnier (part 2): William Gordon-Thomas
 1993: Des héros ordinaires by Yvan Butler (1 episode, Les Saigneurs): Plessis
 1994: Les Cordier, juge et flic (Une mort programmée): Ackmann
 2000: Julie Lescaut (Soupçon d'euthanasie): Danteille
 2000: Une femme d'honneur by Philippe Monnier: Michel Durieux
 2005: Le Fantôme du lac by Philippe Niang: Victor Lanzi

Recordings (selected)
1965, La Compagnie Marie Bell, Phèdre (Racine)

 References 

External links
 Base La Grange sur le site de la Comédie-Française
 Les Gens du cinéma Les Archives du spectacle''
 Media collection at the Bibliothèque nationale de France Claude Giraud
 

1936 births
2020 deaths
People from Chamalières
French male stage actors
French male film actors